The 1981 Monte Carlo Open was a men's tennis tournament played on outdoor clay courts at the Monte Carlo Country Club in Roquebrune-Cap-Martin, France that was part of the 1981 Volvo Grand Prix circuit. It was the 75th edition of the tournament and was held from 13 April until 20 April 1981. Jimmy Connors and Guillermo Vilas were considered runners-up since the final, which was already postponed to Monday due to rain, was abandoned due to further rain at 5–5 in the first set.

Finals

Singles
No winner as the final was abandoned.   Jimmy Connors and  Guillermo Vilas 5–5Jimmy Connors and  Guillermo Vilas both received  runners-up finishes.

Doubles
 Heinz Günthardt /  Balázs Taróczy defeated  Pavel Složil /  Tomáš Šmíd 6–3, 6–3

References

External links
 
 ATP tournament profile
 ITF tournament details

Monte Carlo Open
Monte-Carlo Masters
1981 in Monégasque sport
Monte